Albert of Cashel was an eighth century saint and Patron of Cashel, Ireland.

Life
Traditionally held to be an Englishman who worked in Ireland and then Bavaria, Albert went to Jerusalem and died in Regensburg on his return journey.
 
He was an evangelist working mainly around the city of Cashel, and may have been a bishop there. In a legendary 12th century biography he is called natione Anglus, conversatione Angelicus - “by race an Angle, in manners an angel". He continued his work as an Evangelist in Bavaria with Saint Erhard of Regensburg and is reported to have suffered from arthritis in his back and hips.

He made a pilgrimage to Jerusalem, with Erhard of Regensburg. He traveled to Jerusalem but died in 800 AD at Regensburg on the return journey. Albert's grave is in Niedermünster in Regensburg and he was canonized 19 June 1902 by Pope Leo XIII.

Controversy
His existence has been questioned by some, others question his role as Archbishop of Cashel, stating that this diocese did not exist until 1118 AD.

See also
 Rock of Cashel
 Archbishop of Cashel
 Cashel, Ireland
 Regensburg
 Scots Monastery, Regensburg

Literature
 Stefan Weber: Die Konstruktion eines fabulösen »irischen« Heiligenlebens? Der heilige Albert, Regensburg und die Iren, in: Irische Mönche in Süddeutschland. Literarisches und kulturelles Wirken der Iren im Mittelalter, ed. D. Walz/J. Kaffanke (Lateinische Literatur im deutschen Südwesten 2), Heidelberg 2009, p. 229-304.

References

Medieval English saints
8th-century Irish bishops
8th-century Christian saints
Canonizations by Pope Leo XIII
Year of birth unknown
800 deaths